Bernard Alvarez is a retired NASCAR Grand National Series race car driver whose career spanned from 1964 to 1965.

Career
Alvarez's career was rather short, with no wins or top ten finishes resulting from it. However, he managed to finish an average of 25th place after starting an average of 19th. His  of racing would earn him $1,250 ($ when adjusted for inflation), which was considered a decent salary for the time. All of his races ended in mechanical failure and he became a driver/owner in 1964.

Motorsports career results

NASCAR 
(key) (Bold – Pole position awarded by qualifying time. Italics – Pole position earned by points standings or practice time. * – Most laps led.)

Grand National Series

References

External links
 

Living people
1939 births
Sportspeople from Jacksonville, Florida
Racing drivers from Florida
Racing drivers from Jacksonville, Florida
NASCAR drivers